Glitter bombing is an act of protest in which activists throw glitter on people at public events. Glitter bombers have frequently been motivated by, though not limited to, their targets' rape apologism or opposition to same-sex marriage.

Some legal officials argue glitter bombing is  assault and battery. It is possible for glitter to enter the eyes or nose and cause damage to the cornea or other soft tissues potentially irritating them or leading to infection, depending on the size of the glitter. Whether a prosecutor would pursue the charges depends on a number of factors.

Notable incidents

Postal glitter bombs

Glitter bombs can be sent through the post, so that glitter falls from an envelope or is forcefully ejected from a larger, spring-loaded package when opened. Shipyourenemiesglitter.com went viral in January 2015 as the first postal glitter bomb service to send envelopes filled with glitter to recipients. Shortly after, a video of a spring loaded glitter bomb package from RuinDays.com went viral that demonstrated a postal glitter bomb in action for the first time. There are now many other websites and services offering postal glitter bombs.

In media

Youtube
Youtube content-creator Mark Rober built a glitter bomb that was combined with regular emissions of an aerosolized fart odor to trap package thieves. He used 4 phones with cameras and a GPS device so he could record the thief, upload the data, and recover the package. He then sent about 10 out and showed the footage from the packages on his Youtube channel.

In fiction
In the Season 3 premiere of Glee, William McKinley High School teacher and Glee Club director Will Schuester glitter bombs cheerleading coach and candidate for the United States House of Representatives Sue Sylvester as a protest against her support for cutting federal funding for the arts in public schools. The tactic backfires, as Sue sees a boost in her poll numbers after the event is posted to YouTube.

See also

Acid throwing
Egging
Flour bombing
Incidents of objects being thrown at politicians
Inking (attack)
Milkshaking
Pieing
Shoe-throwing
Tactical frivolity
Zapping
Zelyonka attack
 List of practical joke topics

References

Further reading 

 

Civil disobedience
Protest tactics
LGBT rights movement
2011 in the United States
Assault